Mount Crean is one of the westernmost peaks in the dry valley region of South Victoria Land in Antarctica. It is named after the Irish explorer Tom Crean, who was a member of both of Captain Scott's Antarctic expeditions (Discovery, 1901–04 and Terra Nova, 1910–13), and served as second officer on Sir Ernest Shackleton's Imperial Trans-Antarctic Expedition, 1914–17.

In the 2000–01 summer season a meteorite was found on Mount Crean by a geological party.

There is also a Mount Crean  in Greenland.

Sources

References

Crean
McMurdo Dry Valleys